Debagandhari is a rāga belonging to the tradition of Odissi music. Falling under the meḷa of the same name, the raga uses komala dhaibata and is traditionally associated with the karuṇa rasa.

Structure 
The raga is sampurna or heptatonic in its aroha and abaroha (ascent and descent). Its aroha-abaroha are given below :

Aroha : S R G M P d N S 

Abaroha : S N d P M G R S

The raga dwells or does nyasa on the panchama, as per tradition and evokes a pensive mood.

Compositions 
Some of the well-known traditional compositions in this raga include :

 Jaa Re Jaa, Brajaraja Nagare Tu Jaa by Lokanath Pattanayaka
 Pranabandhua Aja To Anauni Nua by Kabisurjya Baladeba Ratha

References 

Ragas of Odissi music